Emilio Banfi (born 1881, date of death unknown) was an Italian track and field athlete who competed at the 1900 Summer Olympics in Paris, France.

Biography
Banfi competed in the 800 metres. He placed somewhere between fourth and sixth in his first-round (semifinals) heat and did not advance to the final.

At the 1900 Summer Olympics in Paris, Banfi held a valuable correspondence with La Gazzetta dello Sport.

Achievements

References

Bibliography
 De Wael, Herman. Herman's Full Olympians: "Athletics 1900". Accessed 18 March 2006.

External links

 La squadra italiana Parigi 1900 

Italian male middle-distance runners
Athletes (track and field) at the 1900 Summer Olympics
Olympic athletes of Italy
People from Saronno
1881 births
Year of death missing
Sportspeople from the Province of Varese
Date of birth missing
Place of death missing